Halmyra is a monotypic genus of planthoppers in the tribe Delphacini, erected by I. D. Mitjaev in 1971.  It contains the species Halmyra aeluropodis from Kazakhstan.

References

External links 
 

Auchenorrhyncha genera
 Delphacinae